The Malgana are an Aboriginal Australian people of Western Australia.

Language
Malgana belongs to the Kartu language family. It died out by the mid-20th century, but a salvage grammar of the language, based on old recordings and records, was produced by Andrew Gargett in 2011.

Country
He located their traditional lands as lying on the inland plateau from Hamelin Pool south of the Wooramel River area. He placed their eastern confines around the Talisker pastoral lease, and their southern limits near Ajana, Coolcalalaya, and Riverside in the Murchison River area. The Nhanda lay to their south, with the border boundary between the two near the present day Gee Gie Outcamp, while their northern neighbours were the Yingkarta.

In 2018 much of the Shark Bay area, contiguous land extending over Dirk Hartog Island National Park, Edel Land Peninsula and Steep Point, the town of Denham, Peron Peninsula, and some pastoral leases, was recognised as coming under Malgana traditional territory in a native title decision.

People
The Malgana were by Tindale's time a small tribe, who, with the changes brought about by colonial settlement, somewhat overshadowed by the neighbouring Tedei and Inggarda. They did not practise ritual circumcision, unlike the tribes to their east. They appear to have shared several customs with the tribes formally grouped under the generic name Kakarakala, namely the Yinikutira, Baiyungu, Maia, and Yingkarda.

The Malgana used to dig water traps by creating water soaks during the wet season, and conserving the water supply over the dry periods from evaporation and use by animals by covering the sites with stones.

History of contact
Modern settlement by European colonists in Malgana territory began in 1874, when the estimated local population was 200. However, it is quite possible that the Malgana had had occasion to encounter white people centuries before that time. The Dutch trading ship Zuytdorp, while on route to  Batavia, was wrecked in this area in 1712, at a site known as the Zuytdorp Cliffs. In Malgana tradition, accounts of a shipwreck and of the survivors were narrated, and British colonists were told of the circumstances over a century later. According to this oral tradition, the survivors constructed two sizeable houses, and three outhouses, above the cliffs near where their ship had sunk, made of salvaged wood and canvas, and exchanged reserves of food for native hunting implements.

Native title
The decision was handed down by Justice Bernard Murphy. The decision came two decades after the first application for native title by the Malgana made on 30 March 1998, and accords the people exclusive rights to occupy, hunt and fish in the zone and unexclusive rights to camp, build shelters and travel unhampered through the area.

Some words
 mama/mamadi = father.
 nanga/ngangga =mother.
 duthu = (wild?) dog

Notes

Citations

Sources

Aboriginal peoples of Western Australia